The State of North Carolina has a group of protected areas known as the North Carolina State Park System, which is managed by the North Carolina Division of Parks and Recreation (NCDPR), an agency of the North Carolina Department of Natural and Cultural Resources (NCDNCR).  Units of the system can only be established by an act of the General Assembly of North Carolina.  The park system began in 1916 when the summit of Mount Mitchell became first state park in the Southeastern United States.  According to the Division of Parks & Recreation, "the State Parks Act of 1987 lists six types of units included in the NC State Parks System."  These are State Parks, State Recreation Areas, State Natural Areas, State Lakes, State Trails, and State Rivers.  All units of the system are owned and/or managed by the division, and the division leases some of the units to other agencies for operation.  Most units of the park system are also components of State Nature and Historic Preserve.

State Parks
State Parks are the principle unit of the state park system.  The NC Division of Parks & Recreation describes its parks as follows:

Generally, State Parks are expected to possess both significant natural resource values and significant recreational values. State Parks are expected to accommodate the development of facilities, but may vary in the extent of development depending upon what can be provided without damage to the scenic or natural features. Facilities are planned and constructed to keep disturbance of natural resources to a minimum and to leave a "liberal portion" of each park undisturbed and free from improvements and structures, except for trails.

Several of the State Parks are new and are still being planned and developed. A few of the older state parks were greatly expanded in size in the 2000s adding trails and bike paths open to the public.

State Recreation Areas
State Recreation Areas are more intensely developed units than State Parks, and they largely encompass lands less sensitive to human activities than State Parks.  According to the NC Division of Parks & Recreation:

State Recreation Areas are sites where the primary purpose is outdoor recreation, rather than preservation. More intensive development of facilities is provided than in State Parks. Protection and enjoyment of the natural resources are still important, and the sites are expected to contain scenic and attractive natural features. Development is planned and constructed to keep a "reasonable amount" of each area undisturbed and free from improvements and structures.

State Natural Areas
State Natural Areas protect areas more sensitive to human activities than State Parks.  Most of the State Natural Areas are undeveloped and have limited to no facilities, and some of them are closed to the general public to protect rare, fragile ecosystems.  A few have developed facilities for low intensity, passive recreation, as well as facilities for public interpretation and education of the natural area.  The NC Division of Parks & Recreation states:

The purpose of State Natural Areas is focused on preserving and protecting areas of scientific, aesthetic, or ecological value. Facilities are limited to those needed for interpretation, protection, and minimum maintenance. Generally, recreational and public use facilities such as camping, swimming, picnicking, and the like are not provided in State Natural Areas.

State Lakes
State Lakes are all large, naturally formed bodies of water in the state's Coastal Plain.  Most of the lakes are Carolina Bays.  The NC Division of Parks & Recreation describes its State Lakes as follows:

Chapter 165 of the Laws of 1929 specified that "all lakes now belonging to the State having an area of 50 acres or more" should be "administered as provided for other recreational areas now owned by the State." This allowed the then-Department of Conservation and Development to assume management authority for seven Coastal Plain lakes that became units of the State Parks System known as State Lakes. Most of these are administratively included as part of an adjoining State Park, but one of the lakes (White Lake) has no public ownership on its shoreline.

State Trails
State Trails are one of the principal components of the State Trail System.  State Trails may be either long-distance, hiking trails or paddle trails.  State Trails may have land components for providing a trail corridor or for protecting significant features or resources along the trail.  Most of these lands are leased to other land management agencies.  All of the State Trails are joint projects with other government agencies and nonprofit organizations.  The following is the NC Division of Parks & Recreation description of State Trails:

The North Carolina Trails System Act was passed in 1973 to help provide for the state's outdoor recreation needs and to promote public access to natural and scenic areas. The act prescribed methods for establishing a statewide system of scenic trails, recreation trails, and connecting or side trails. The Trails System includes "park trails", which are designated and managed as units of the State Parks System known as State Trails, and "designated trails", which are managed by other governmental agencies or corporations.

State Rivers
State Rivers are components of the state's Natural and Scenic Rivers System, which is the state's equivalent to the National Wild and Scenic Rivers System.  Most of the state's National Wild and Scenic Rivers, are also State Rivers and vice versa.  The NC Division of Parks & Recreation states that:

The Natural and Scenic Rivers System was created by the 1971 General Assembly to preserve and protect certain free flowing rivers, their water quality and their adjacent lands for the benefit of present and future generations. The Natural and Scenic Rivers Act established criteria and methods for inclusion of components to the system. Components of the Natural and Scenic Rivers System are State Rivers, and are also units of the State Parks System.

Former units
Some units have been formally removed from the NC State Park System and transferred to other agencies for management.

When the State Historic Site system was established in 1955, the system's first six components were historic properties transferred from the State Park System.

One unit, Rendezvous Mountain, was transferred back to the park system, after 66 years in the state forest system.

See also
List of U.S. national parks
List of North Carolina state forests
List of National Natural Landmarks in North Carolina

Notes

References

External links
 NC State Parks home page
 Size of the North Carolina State Park System (Updated biannually)
 NC General Statute § 143‑260.10.  Components of State Nature and Historic Preserve.

 
State parks
North Carolina state parks